Launch Complex 15 (LC-15) at Cape Canaveral Space Force Station, Florida is a deactivated launch complex  used by LGM-25 Titan missiles between 1959 and 1964. It was originally built for conducting test flights of the Titan I, which made its maiden flight from LC-15 on 6 February 1959. LC-15 is the southernmost of the four original Titan launch complexes on Missile Row.

The last of ten Titan I launches from LC-15 occurred in September 1960. Following this, it was converted for use by the Titan II, which made the first of 16 flights from the complex in June 1962. The last launch from LC-15 occurred on 9 April 1964.

Following the last launch, LC-15 remained active until its retirement from service. Much of the complex, including the tower, launch stand and erector was demolished in June 1967. The blockhouse, cable tunnel, and parts of the launch table and ramp were abandoned in place, and were all still standing until the demolition of the blockhouse in 2011.

On March 7th 2023 the Space Force allocated the complex, which was renamed SLC-15, to ABL Space Systems. ABL will build a launch installation for their RS1 small class launch vehicle.

References

Cape Canaveral Space Force Station
Demolished buildings and structures in Florida
Buildings and structures demolished in 1967
Launch complexes of the United States Space Force